The Hotel Sterling is an historic hotel, which is located in Allentown, Lehigh County, Pennsylvania. Built between 1889 and 1890, it is a three-story rectangular brick building that was designed in the Romanesque Revival style with Queen Anne and Eastlake influences.

History and architectural features
The Hotel Sterling is three bays wide, with a gabled parapet at the middle bay. When nominated for the National Register of Historic Places in 1980, it had thirty-three sleeping rooms.

The hotel was built simultaneously with the Central Railroad of New Jersey and Lehigh Valley Railroad stations. Situated directly across Hamilton Street, the proximity of the hotel and stations provided travelers with convenient places to eat and stay in Allentown. With the end of passenger rail service in the 1960s, the hotel was adapted to other uses.

It was subsequently added to the National Register of Historic Places in 1984.

Today, the hotel is primarily used as the venue for the Deja Vu nightclub, which features live music acts. On June 20, 2019, it became the site of gun violence between rival gangs, the Bloods and Latin Kings. Ten people were shot.

See also
List of historic places in Allentown, Pennsylvania

References

External links
The Historic Sterling Hotel

Hotel buildings on the National Register of Historic Places in Pennsylvania
Romanesque Revival architecture in Pennsylvania
Hotel buildings completed in 1890
History of Allentown, Pennsylvania
Buildings and structures in Allentown, Pennsylvania
National Register of Historic Places in Lehigh County, Pennsylvania